Delaram may refer to:
 Delaram, Markazi
 Delaram, Sistan and Baluchestan

See also
Delaram, city in Nimruz Province, Afghanistan